Wilmer Allison and John Van Ryn were the defending champions, but Allison did not compete. Van Ryn partnered with George Lott, and defeated John Doeg and George Lott in the final, 6–2, 10–8, 9–11, 3–6, 6–3 to win the gentlemen's doubles tennis title at the 1931 Wimbledon Championship.

Seeds

  George Lott /  John Van Ryn (champions)
  Jacques Brugnon /  Henri Cochet (final)
  Pat Hughes /  Fred Perry (semifinals)
  Ian Collins /  Colin Gregory (quarterfinals)

Draw

Finals

Top half

Section 1

Section 2

Bottom half

Section 3

Section 4

References

External links

Men's Doubles
Wimbledon Championship by year – Men's doubles